Garden of Delights may refer to:

Film
 The Garden of Delights (El jardín de las delicias), 1970 Spanish drama film

Literature
 Hortus deliciarum (Garden of Delights), 12th century manuscript
 Le jardin des délices (Garden of Delights), 1968 play by Fernando Arrabal
 Le jardin des délices (The Garden of Delights), 1978 book by Roch Carrier and Sheila Fischman
 Gardens of Delight, 2006 book by Erica James

Music

Albums
 Garden of Delight, 2008 album by Paul Avgerinos
 Garden of Delights, 2007 album by Out of Focus
 Garden of Delights, 2016 album by Chuck Israels Jazz Orchestra
 The Flute's Garden of Delights, music collection by Jacob van Eyck

Songs
 "Garden of Delight (Hereafter)", song by The Mission from the album God's Own Medicine
 "Garden of Delight", song by Steelheart from the album Wait
 "Garden of Delight", song demo by My Bloody Valentine recorded prior to the album This Is Your Bloody Valentine
 "Garden of Delights", song by Liz and Lisa from the album Liz and Lisa
 later recorded by Lisa Loeb & Nine Stories from the album Tails
 "Gardens of Delight", song by Vangelis from the soundtrack album Alexander

Places
 Nishat Bagh, translated to Garden of Delight, a Mughal garden in Srinagar, Kashmir, India
 Jannat al-Na‘īm (Garden of Delight), one of the layers of Jannah

See also
 Garden of Earthly Delights (disambiguation)
 Delights of the Garden, 2002 album by Desmond Williams
 :de:Garden of Delight (deutsche Band), German gothic rock/metal band